Gaaden (Central Bavarian: Goodn) is a town in the district of Mödling in the Austrian state of Lower Austria.

Geography
Gaaden lies in the northern Vienna woods at the foot of the Anninger.

Population

References

Cities and towns in Mödling District